The flyweight class was the lightest class in the boxing at the 1964 Summer Olympics competition. Flyweights were limited to those boxers weighing less than 51 kilograms. The competition was held from October 12, 1964, to October 23, 1964. 28 boxers from 28 nations competed.

After one minute and six seconds of the first round of his quarterfinal bout against Stanislav Sorokin, Choh Dong-Kih was disqualified for holding his head too low. Unable to accept the verdict, Dong sat in the middle of the ring for 51 minutes, until officials persuaded him to leave.

Medalists

Results

Sources

References

Flyweight